Axel Fernando Ahumada Flores (born 4 May 1977) is a Chilean former professional footballer who played as a forward for clubs in Chile and Venezuela.

Club career
A well-known former player of Coquimbo Unido, in Chile he also played for Colo-Colo, Universidad de Concepción, San Luis, Deportes La Serena, Everton de Viña del Mar, Cobresal, Deportes Arica and Rangers de Talca. Along with Everton, he got promotion to the Primera División after winning the 2003 Primera B. In 2003, he also had a brief stint with Brazilian side Centro Sportivo Alagoano alongside his fellow footballer Carlos Gajardo.

International career
In 2001, Ahumada made two appearances for the Chile national team in the 2002 FIFA World Cup qualifiers against Bolivia and Ecuador. He joined the squad after Marcelo Corrales was injured.

Personal life
While he was a player of Rangers de Talca, it was reported that he had committed violent acts against his family, so he was fired from the club.

In December 2012, he took part in friendly matches to collect money for Sueño Canario (Canary Dream), an initiative to help municipal schools in Quillota. For his team, he played alongside former footballers such as Rafael Celedón, Miguel Ángel Castillo and Franz Arancibia.

Honours
Everton
 Primera B de Chile: 2003

References

External links
 
 Axel Ahumada at Playmakerstats.com
 Axel Ahumada at PartidosdeLaRoja 
 

1977 births
Living people
People from Quillota
Chilean footballers
Chilean expatriate footballers
Chile international footballers
Colo-Colo footballers
Universidad de Concepción footballers
San Luis de Quillota footballers
Coquimbo Unido footballers
Deportes La Serena footballers
Centro Sportivo Alagoano players
Everton de Viña del Mar footballers
Cobresal footballers
San Marcos de Arica footballers
Rangers de Talca footballers
Tercera División de Chile players
Chilean Primera División players
Primera B de Chile players
Campeonato Brasileiro Série C players
Venezuelan Primera División players
Chilean expatriate sportspeople in Brazil
Chilean expatriate sportspeople in Venezuela
Expatriate footballers in Venezuela
Expatriate footballers in Brazil
Association football forwards